Madanpur may refer to:
Madanpur, Lalitpur, India
Madanpur, Nadia, India
Madanpur, Nuwakot, Nepal
Madanpur, Rautahat, Nepal